Norman Bird Sanctuary is a  bird sanctuary, nature preserve, environmental education center, and museum at 583 Third Beach Road in Middletown, Rhode Island overlooking the Atlantic Ocean.

In 1949, the Norman Bird Sanctuary was founded through a bequest in the will of Mabel Norman Cerio. The Sanctuary comprises the largest area of preserved open space in Newport County. There are 325 acres and 7 miles of hiking trails. The refuge contains hay fields, woodlands and ridges overlooking the ocean and ponds. Hanging Rock, a prominent local landmark, is located within the sanctuary overlooking the ocean. There is also a Visitor's Center and gift shop, and a 19th-century barn museum featuring displays about the wildlife for children and adults.

History
The property of the Norman Bird Sanctuary has an agricultural history dating to the early 18th century, when a large tract of land was purchased by Isaac Smith, a descendant of one of the area's first settlers. The main farmhouse on the property is a typical Colonial-era farmhouse, five bays wide with a large central chimney, and dates to about 1755. The property, then , was auctioned to pay debts in 1782; the purchaser was Benjamin Gardiner. This core portion of the sanctuary was listed on the National Register of Historic Places in 2008.

Gallery

See also
 List of museums in Rhode Island
 National Register of Historic Places listings in Newport County, Rhode Island
 Sachuest Point National Wildlife Refuge

References

External links
  Official Norman Bird Sanctuary Wildlife Refuge website
 The Scenic Third Beach Project—includes a map of the Norman Bird Sanctuary and surrounding area

1950 establishments in Rhode Island
Bird observatories in the United States
Bird sanctuaries of the United States
Buildings and structures completed in 1950
Education in Newport County, Rhode Island
Environmental organizations established in 1950
Historic districts in Newport County, Rhode Island
Historic districts on the National Register of Historic Places in Rhode Island
Middletown, Rhode Island
Museums established in 1950
Museums in Newport County, Rhode Island
National Register of Historic Places in Newport County, Rhode Island
Natural history museums in Rhode Island
Nature centers in Rhode Island
Nature conservation organizations based in the United States
Nature reserves in Rhode Island
Non-profit organizations based in Rhode Island
Ornithological organizations in the United States
Parks on the National Register of Historic Places in Rhode Island
Protected areas established in 1950
Protected areas of Newport County, Rhode Island